The Shortest Battle in the Philippine History the BATTLE OF 3 MINUTES, Raid on Paombong was organized and executed on September 3, 1897, between the Philippine revolutionaries led by Captain Gregorio del Pilar and the Paombong katipuneros on a blitzkrieg attack on the Spanish church and convent in the municipality of Paombong.

Attack

The following day, Sunday, Del Pilar and his men stationed themselves at the Church as soon as the Mass was about to begin. When the men who were dressed in their Sunday best got close to the church doors, they surprised the Spanish troops with a shot to the sentry guarding the convent. Del Pilar himself began shooting at the guards who were about to station to the windows, forcing the Spanish soldiers to leave and abandon their guns. The attack was successfully carried out with the capture of 14 Mauser rifles and other supplies. It is often described as one of the finest assaults during Philippine Revolution. Shortly thereafter, Philippine President Emilio Aguinaldo raised Gregorio del Pilar to the rank of lieutenant colonel.

References

Paombong
History of Bulacan
Paombong
Paombong